Dioila is a small town and seat of the commune of Kaladougou in the Cercle of Dioila in the Koulikoro Region of south-western Mali. According to old aeronautical charts, the town was served by two airports: An old one near the town center and a new one across the river in the north. Recent maps and satellite imagery however show neither of the two.

References

Populated places in Koulikoro Region